Yvrase Gerville (born 20 November 1993) is a Haitian women's association football player who plays as a forward.

International goals
Scores and results list Haiti's goal tally first

References

External links 
 

1993 births
Living people
Women's association football forwards
Haitian women's footballers
Haiti women's international footballers
Competitors at the 2014 Central American and Caribbean Games